Chenega may refer to:

Places in the United States
Chenega, Alaska, a community
Chenega Bay, Alaska, a community
Chenega Glacier, a glacier on Prince William Sound
Chenega Island, an island in Prince William Sound

Vessels
MV Chenega, an Alaska Marine Highway System vessel

See also
 Chengara, Kerala, India